The Miss Universe Germany 2017 pageant was held on September 24, 2017 in the Dormero Hotel Bonn in Windhagen. At the conclusion of the final night of competition, Sophia Koch from Saxony-Anhalt won the title. She represented Germany at Miss Universe 2017  pageant held in November 2017. The director of the pageant, Kim Kotter set thirty-two franchise holders to be able to select candidates to represent states and regions of the country.

Final results

Official Delegates

External links
Official Website

2017 beauty pageants
2017 in Berlin
2017